Thailand competed at the 1988 Summer Paralympics in Seoul, South Korea. Ten competitors from Thailand won a single bronze medal and finished joint 45th in the medal table along with Czechoslovakia.

See also 
 Thailand at the Paralympics
 Thailand at the 1988 Summer Olympics

References 

Nations at the 1988 Summer Paralympics
1988
Summer Paralympics